Margarosticha repetitalis is a moth in the family Crambidae. It was described by Warren in 1896. It is found in Australia, where it has been recorded from Queensland and Western Australia.

The wingspan is about 30 mm. The wings are orange with brown and buff markings. There is a series of black spots on the hind wing margin.

The larvae feed on Hydrilla verticillata. They feed on the leaves of their host plant, defoliating the stems to an  extent.

References

Acentropinae
Moths described in 1896